In the 2006 municipal elections in Ontario, voters in the province of Ontario, elected mayors, councillors, school board trustees and all other elected officials in all of Ontario's municipalities.  These elections were regulated by the Municipal Elections Act of Ontario.

Date 
Municipal elections in all Ontario municipalities took place on Monday, November 13, 2006 (notwithstanding advance polling arrangements). Currently municipal elections in Ontario have fixed election dates, and the next round of elections are due to take place in November, 2010.  Prior to the vote in 2006, the period between elections had been 3 years.

Voting Notice and Attention 
Candidates may have withdrawn from the race prior to November 13, 2006, and while their names may still have appeared on the ballot, voting for a withdrawn candidate resulted in a spoiled ballot and was not counted.

Term lengths 

The Legislative Assembly of Ontario legislation (Bill 81, Schedule H), passed in 2006, sets the length of terms in office for all municipal elected officials at four years.

Campaigns in major cities 
In Toronto, their municipal election had incumbent mayor David Miller easily defeating councillor Jane Pitfield and former Liberal Party president Stephen LeDrew.

Ottawa's election race was a heated affair with incumbent mayor Bob Chiarelli finishing third behind victorious businessman Larry O'Brien and popular former councillor Alex Munter.

In London, incumbent mayor Anne Marie DeCicco-Best defeated Liberal MP Joe Fontana. In Mississauga, Hazel McCallion, who has been mayor since 1978 faced little competition en route to victory.

Larry Di Ianni, Hamilton's mayor was upset in an extremely close race by former alderman Fred Eisenberger.

In Greater Sudbury, mayor David Courtemanche was defeated by former NDP MP John Rodriguez.

In Guelph, former mayor Karen Farbridge defeated incumbent mayor Kate Quarrie in a reversal of the election three years prior when Quarrie defeated Farbridge.

Municipalities with over 100,000 inhabitants
The following lists mayoral races and city council races unless a main article exists, in which case only the mayoral races are listed here. In the tables, candidates marked with an (X) were the incumbent.

Barrie

Mayoral race

City council

Brampton

Mayoral race

Burlington
Mayoral race

City and regional council

Cambridge

Mayoral race

Chatham-Kent

Mayoral race

Greater Sudbury

Mayoral race

City council: See separate article.

Guelph

Mayoral race

Hamilton

Mayoral race

City council
 See main article

Kingston
Mayoral race

City council

Kitchener
Mayoral race

City council

Regional council

London
Mayoral race

Board of control

(Four to be elected)

City council

Markham

Mayor

Regional council

Town council

Mississauga

Mayoral race

Oakville

Mayoral race

Town & regional council
See main article

Oshawa

Mayoral race

Ottawa

Mayoral race

Richmond Hill

Mayoral race

Other races 
See main article

St. Catharines

Mayoral race

Other races
See main article

Thunder Bay

Mayoral race

Toronto

Mayoral race

City council

See main article

Vaughan

Mayoral race

Other races
See main article

Windsor

Mayor

Other races 
 See main article

Municipalities with 25,000 to 100,000 people
Races for mayor only, see main article for more information. In the tables, candidates marked with an (X) were the incumbent.

Municipalities with 5,000 to 25,000 people
(Elected mayors shown only)

The Municipalities of Prescott and Russell
(Elected mayors shown only)

See also 

 Municipal elections in Canada
 2003 Ontario municipal elections
 Electronic voting in Canada

External links
 Ontario Ministry of Municipal Affairs and Housing Elections Page
 Council results for every municipality
 Town of Ajax elections
 City of Barrie Municipal Elections
 City of Belleville Municipal Elections
 City of Brampton Municipal Elections
 City of Brantford Municipal Elections
 City of Burlington Municipal Elections
 City of Cambridge Municipal Elections
 Community of Chatham-Kent Municipal Elections
 Clarington Votes 2006
 City of Greater Sudbury Elections
 City of Guelph Elections
 City of Hamilton Municipal Elections
 City of Kawartha Lakes Municipal Election
 City of Kingston Municipal Elections
 City of Kitchener Municipal Elections
 City of London Municipal Elections
 Town of Markham Municipal Elections
 City of Mississauga Municipal Elections
 Town of Newmarket Municipal Election 2006
 City of Niagara Falls Municipal Elections
 Norfolk County 2006 Municipal Election
 Town of Oakville Municipal Elections
 City of Oshawa Municipal Elections
 City of Ottawa Municipal Elections
 City of Peterborough Municipal Elections - online voting
  City of Pickering municipal elections
 Town of Richmond Hill Elections
 City of Sarnia Municipal Elections
 City of Sault Ste. Marie elections
 City of St. Catharines Elections
 City of Thunder Bay Municipal Elections
 City of Toronto Municipal Elections
 City of Waterloo Municipal Elections
 City of Welland Municipal Elections
 City of Windsor Municipal Elections
 Whitby Municipal Elections 2006

References